Lieutenant Claude Melnot Wilson DFC (16 September 1898 – 14 October 1918) was a Canadian World War I flying ace credited with eight aerial victories.

Early life
Claude Melnot Wilson was the son of Margaret and Charles Hurst Wilson of Vancouver, British Columbia, Canada. However, he was a Winnipeg habitué.

Military service

Wilson transferred from artillery to the Royal Flying Corps, and was assigned to No. 29 Squadron RAF on 4 May 1918. Off to hospital on 15 May, he did not return to duty until 23 June. He scored his first one on 22 July 1918, flying a Hannover observation plane down out of control. In August, Wilson tallied six more victories, starting with an Albatros reconnaissance plane destroyed in cooperation with fellow aces Arthur Reed and Henry Coyle Rath on the 8th. His final victory came on 18 September 1918. He used a Royal Aircraft Factory SE.5a for all his victories. His victory roll included five enemy planes and an observation balloon destroyed, and two planes driven down out of control.

Death in action
Wilson was killed in action near Roulers on 14 October 1918, and interred in the New British Cemetery in Dadizele, Belgium in Plot VI.F.26.

Honours and awards
Wilson was posthumously awarded the Distinguished Flying Cross (DFC). The citation reads: 
   
Bold in attack, this officer never hesitates to join in an engagement with the enemy, regardless of their numerical superiority. On 18 August, with four other machines, he attacked a large hostile formation. Five enemy machines were destroyed, Lt. Wilson accounting for one. In all he has four machines and one balloon to his credit.

References

Bibliography

External links
Canadian Virtual War Memorial
Canadian Great War Project
Photograph on Twitter
CWGC tribute

1898 births
1918 deaths
Canadian World War I flying aces
Recipients of the Distinguished Flying Cross (United Kingdom)
British military personnel killed in World War I